Extra! was a short-lived American comic book magazine published by EC Comics in 1955 as the third title in its New Direction line. The bi-monthly comic was published by Bill Gaines and edited by Johnny Craig. It lasted a total of five issues before being cancelled, along with EC's other New Direction comics.

Extra! was dedicated to stories about the adventures of various journalists, who alternated as protagonists: Keith Michaels, Steve Rampart and Geri Hamilton. The rotational use was similar to the Ghoulunatics in EC's three horror comics.

The contributors to this title include Craig, John Severin, and Reed Crandall. Craig was responsible for the art on the Keith Michaels stories. Severin handled the Steve Rampart stories while Crandall covered the Geri Hamilton ones. Craig was responsible for the art for all five covers.

Extra! was reprinted as part of publisher Russ Cochran's Complete EC Library in 1988. Between January and May 2000, Cochran (in association with Gemstone Publishing) reprinted all five individual issues. This complete run was later rebound, with covers included, in a single softcover EC Annual.

Issue guide

Sources

External links
 http://comicbookdb.com/title.php?ID=12267
 https://www.ijpc.org/uploads/files/Tom%20Brislin%20--%20Extra!%20The%20Comic%20Book.pdf

EC Comics publications
Bimonthly magazines published in the United States
Adventure comics
Crime comics
1955 comics debuts
1955 comics endings
Magazines established in 1955
Magazines disestablished in 1955
1955 establishments in the United States
1955 disestablishments in the United States
Defunct American comics